Toomas Takjas (also Toomas Takkias; 6 March 1900 Kalvi Parish, Virumaa – 22 September 1987 Rakvere) was an Estonian agronomist and politician. He was a member of Estonian National Assembly.

References

1900 births
1987 deaths
Estonian agronomists
Members of the Estonian National Assembly
Estonian military personnel of the Estonian War of Independence
People from Viru-Nigula Parish